Marion Young, GM, was a student nurse when she attempted to talk down convicted murderer, spree killer and serial killer Robert Mone, and save the life of Nanette Hanson. She was later awarded the George Medal. Young married in 1968.

St John's School Ordeal
Young was an 18-year-old student nurse when she became involved in the atrocities at St John's School, Dundee. She was an acquaintance of Robert Mone's, who demanded that she be brought to the school. Young agreed to negotiate with Mone. His first words to her were: “You thought you were being a brave little girl? How did you know I wouldn’t blow your head off?”

During the ordeal, Mone had fired a number of shots at the door, threatened both Hanson and Young with the shotgun, raped one girl and sexually assaulted another. Hanson and Young persuaded Mone to let the girls go. When he momentarily put the shotgun down, Young picked it up. Mone attacked her and took it back. At about 4.30pm he instructed Hanson to shut the blinds and shot her in the back. Young discovered that despite her injuries, Hanson was still alive and attempted to help her. She pleaded with Mone to allow Hanson to be taken to hospital, and Mone told her dismissively that she could do what she wanted. Mone was arrested and Hanson taken to the Dundee Royal Infirmary, where she later died from her injuries.

Aftermath
For her actions at the school, Marion Young was awarded the George Medal.

References

1949 births
Recipients of the George Medal
Living people